The Superior RoughRiders were a junior ice hockey organization based in Superior, Boulder County, Colorado. The team played in the Western States Hockey League at the Sport Stable in Superior. The Superior RoughRiders are owned by the RoughRiders Hockey Club.

Team history

Under previous ownership, The RoughRiders were formerly known as the Colorado Outlaws from 2007 to 2009. The Colorado Outlaws played in Westminster, Colorado.

In 2009, the franchise was relocated to Boulder Valley Ice in nearby Superior, Colorado, and named the  Boulder Junior Bison. In its inaugural season in Superior, the team went 40–18–2 for second place in the division. The Junior Bison advanced to the Thorne Cup finals, but lost to the Phoenix Polar Bears. As the runners-up in the WSHL, the Bison qualified for the USA Hockey Tier III Junior A National Championships held in Marlborough, Massachusetts. The Bison lost all three games, being outscored 19–2. The Bison moved 10 total players either up on call up or to NCAA.

In its sophomore year in Superior, the Bison earned a regular season record of 33–12–3 record. During the first round of the WSHL playoffs, the Bison swept the Texas Jr. Brahmas with victories in both games one and two (8–7 in overtime and 11–5). They were then eliminated in the Mid-Western Division Finals, losing the series 0–2 to division rival El Paso Rhinos. 11 players from this Bison roster moved on to higher levels of hockey.

On April 15, 2014, the RoughRiders Hockey Club purchased the Jr. Bison and renamed the team the RoughRiders after their junior hockey team in the United States Hockey League, the Cedar Rapids RoughRiders. The team then moved to a new complex called Boulder Valley Ice & Indoor Sports starting with the 2015–16 season. On June 9, 2015, the RoughRiders announced that in order to connect better with their community, the team would be known as the Superior RoughRiders.

In 2018, the RoughRiders were no longer listed as members of the WSHL and their website was shutdown.

Statistics

Regular season records

Playoff records

Playoffs
2008 – Lost Midwest Division Semi-final
El Paso Rhinos defeated Colorado Outlaws 2-games-to-0
2009 – Lost Midwest Division Semi-final
El Paso Rhinos defeated Colorado Outlaws 2-games-to-0
2010 – Lost Thorne Cup Finals
Boulder Bison defeated Tulsa Rampage 2-games-to-0
Boulder Bison defeated El Paso Rhinos 2-games-to-1
Phoenix Polar Bears defeated Boulder Bison 2-games-to-1
2011 – Lost Mountain Divisional Finals
Boulder Bison defeated Texas Jr. Brahmas 2-games-to-0
El Paso Rhinos defeated Boulder Bison 2-games-to-0
2012 – Lost Mountain Divisional Finals
Boulder Bison defeated Cheyenne Stampede 2-games-to-0
Idaho Jr. Steelheads defeated Boulder Bison 2-games-to-1
2013 – Lost Mountain Divisional Finals
Boulder Bison defeated Cheyenne Stampede 2-games-to-0
El Paso Rhinos defeated Boulder Bison 2-games-to-0
2014 – Lost Mountain Divisional Semifinals
Phoenix Knights defeated Boulder Bison 2-games-to-1
2015 – Lost Mountain Divisional Quarterfinal
Salt Lake City Moose defeated Colorado RoughRiders 2-games-to-1
2016 – Lost Mountain Divisional Semifinals
Superior RoughRiders defeated Salt Lake City Moose 2-games-to-1
Colorado Jr. Eagles defeated Superior RoughRiders 2-games-to-0
2017 – Lost Mountain Divisional Quarterfinals
Utah Outliers defeated Superior RoughRiders 2-games-to-0
2018 – Lost Mountain Divisional Semifinals
Superior RoughRiders defeated Casper Coyotes 2-games-to-0
Utah Outliers defeated Superior RoughRiders 2-games-to-1

Alumni
The Bison had a number of alumni move on to NCAA Division III, ACHA Division I and II, and higher levels of junior ice hockey, and professional ice hockey, including:

References

External links
 Official Team Website
 Official League Website

Ice hockey teams in Colorado
Ice hockey clubs established in 2007
2007 establishments in Colorado
Boulder County, Colorado